Barbara Ehardt is an American politician and former college basketball coach serving as a member of the Idaho House of Representatives from the 33rd district.

Early life and education 
Ehardt was born and raised in Idaho Falls, Idaho. She earned an associate degree in general studies from North Idaho College and a Bachelor of Science degree in English and language arts education from Idaho State University, where she played on the Idaho State Bengals women's basketball team.

Career

College basketball 
For 15 years, Ehardt worked as an NCAA Division I women's basketball coach at California State University, Fullerton, the University of California, Santa Barbara, Brigham Young University, and Washington State University.

Politics 
In 2003, Ehardt returned to her hometown of Idaho Falls, Idaho, where she has since operated a sports camp for children and managed basketball programs. Ehardt was appointed to the Idaho House of Representatives on December 27, 2017. In November 2019, Ehardt was labelled "a Republican lightning rod" by East Idaho News. During her first term in the House, she authored a bill that would restrict statewide sex education.

In the legislature, Ehardt sponsored a bill that would required transgender athletes to play on teams corresponding to the gender they were assigned at birth. The bill has attracted significant criticism, both within Idaho and nationally. Ehardt was interviewed as a part of the HBO series Real Sports with Bryant Gumbel, in which she defended the bill.

References 

Living people
People from Idaho Falls, Idaho
Republican Party members of the Idaho House of Representatives
Idaho State University alumni
American women's basketball coaches
Year of birth missing (living people)
BYU Cougars women's basketball coaches
UC Santa Barbara Gauchos women's basketball coaches
Washington State Cougars women's basketball coaches
Cal State Fullerton Titans women's basketball coaches